Pomračenje sunca (Solar Eclipse) is the fourteenth studio album by Yugoslav pop-folk singer Lepa Brena. It was released 6 May 2000 through the record label Grand Production.

This was her final of twelve albums with the band that she started her career with called Slatki Greh. This was also a one-off studio album recorded with her band.

This album was sold in a circulation of 150,000 copies.

Track listing

Personnel

Instruments

Ivica Maksimović – guitar
Boki Milošević – clarinet
Vlada Panović – accordion (9)
Enes Mavrić – accordion (3)

Production and recording
Goran Ratković – producing, engineering
Đorđe Petrović – assistant engineering

Crew
Dragan ŠuhART – design
Dejan Milićević – photography

References

2000 albums
Lepa Brena albums
Grand Production albums